Accolade Wines is an international wine business with headquarters in South Australia and corporate offices in Melbourne. It has been owned by the Carlyle Group, an American private equity company, since 2018.

Accolade, which predominantly uses the Hardy's label, is one of the worlds largest winemakers, has more than 1700 employees around the world, with operations in North America, the United Kingdom, Ireland, mainland Europe, South Africa, Australia, New Zealand and Asia.

History
Accolade Wines traces its beginning to Thomas Hardy and Sons, a company founded in 1853 which grew to become Australia's largest winemaker. The company headquarters are in Old Reynella, South Australia.

At 20 years of age, Thomas Hardy arrived in South Australia after sailing from the English county of Devon in 1850.  He worked at Reynella Farm for John Reynell, then drove cattle to the Victorian goldfields. Hardy used the money he had earned to purchase a property on the banks of the River Torrens, which he named 'Bankside'. Shiraz and Grenache vines were planted on the Bankside property. Wine was sold locally and in England, and the profits enabled Hardy to buy the Tintara Vineyard Company about 1876. Hardy steadily expanded the company over the years, purchasing a bottling plant at Mile End, cellars on Currie Street in Adelaide, and a disused flour mill in McLaren Vale.

In 1938, then chairman Tom Mayfield Hardy was killed in an aeroplane crash along with other leading South Australian winemakers. His cousin, Kenneth Hardy, became chairman.

In 1968, the company established extensive vineyards in the Padthaway area.

In 1976, Thomas Hardy and Sons made its first corporate acquisition by purchasing the London-based Emu Wine Company, which included Houghton (Western Australia's largest winery) and Morphett Vale.

In 1989 the company sold a portion of the Houghton Estate known as "Oakover Grounds" to a Swan Valley family.

In 1982, the company purchased Chateau Reynella, where Thomas Hardy had first worked, and converted it to its headquarters.

Further expansion came in 1992, when Thomas Hardy & Sons merged with Berri Renmano Limited to form what then became Australia's second largest wine group, BRL Hardy Limited.

In 2003, the brands of BRL Hardy and those of Constellation Brands were merged to create the world's largest international wine business. BRL Hardy Limited was renamed The Hardy Wine Company.

In 2006, Constellation Brands acquired Vincor International, adding the West Australian brands of Amberley and Goundrey to the Hardy portfolio.

On 31 March 2008, The Hardy Wine Company changed its name to Constellation Wines Australia.

In February 2011, Constellation Brands sold 80 per cent of Constellation Wines Australia, along with sister company Constellation Europe, to CHAMP Private Equity. Constellation Brands retained a 20 per cent stake in the newly named Accolade Wines.

In October 2015, Accolade sold its 50 per cent share of British drinks distributor Matthew Clark.

In November 2016, the company acquired the Australian premium wine portfolio (Fine Wine Partners) of beverage giant Lion.

In March 2017, CHAMP Private Equity scrapped its plans to float Accolade on the Australian Securities Exchange. The decision was made after overtures from potential Chinese buyers, and a drop in the value of the British pound due to Brexit.

Until 2018, the company was 80 per cent owned by the Australian private equity firm CHAMP Private Equity and 20 per cent owned by the United-States-based alcohol giant Constellation Brands. 100% of the company was sold to the Carlyle Group in 2018.

In October 2019, Accolade divested itself of the historic vineyards and buildings at the Houghton Estate in the Swan Valley to move production of Houghton Wines to its Nannup facility.  The site was purchased by the Yukich family that had previously purchased the Oakover Grounds portion of the estate. The old Houghton site is now known as Nikola Estate.

Operations
Accolade Wines sells its products in over 80 countries, including Australia, the United Kingdom, Ireland, Canada, the United States, Japan, China, and across Continental Europe.

It has branch offices in the United Kingdom (Weybridge and Bristol), Australia (Adelaide, Sydney, Brisbane, Perth and Melbourne), and South Africa (Stellenbosch), as well as in Moscow, Warsaw, Shanghai, Singapore, Beijing and California.

The business is the largest wine company by volume and value in the United Kingdom and Ireland, a highly-competitive market with thin margins. Its popular brands there include:
 Hardys, the number one Australian wine brand in the UK and a significant wine brand in mainland Europe,
 Kumala, the UK's number one South African wine brand,
 Echo Falls, the third largest wine brand in the UK,
 Stowells, the number one wine brand in the UK on-premises trade,
 Banrock Station, the UK's number one environmentally friendly wine brand,
 Wine fusions such as Stone's Ginger Wine, Ginger Joe alcoholic ginger beer and Babycham perry,
 Californian brands such as Geyser Peak, Atlas Peak and XYZin, drawing on the Sonoma and Atlas Peak regions.

The chief executive from October 2015 to August 2016 was Paul Schaafsma, who previously worked for Australian Vintage. From August 2016 to April 2017, the CEO was former APAC GM of Sales, Michael East. The current Chief Executive Officer is Robert Foye, who was named CEO 1 May 2020.

Wine labels / Brands

See also
 Constellation Brands
 South Australian food and drink
 James Hardy – former chairman.

References

External links
Accolade Wines
Constellation Brands

Australian companies established in 1853
Food and drink companies established in 1853
Wineries in McLaren Vale
The Carlyle Group